The Directorate of special units (DSU) is the police tactical unit of the Belgian Federal Police. In total, DSU consists of about 500 highly trained police officers. The centralized 50 operator small assault team of the intervention unit of the DSU is deployed in cases of terrorism, kidnappings, hostage taking and other forms of serious crime. DSU performs emergency responses, high-risk arrests and searches, observation operations, undercover operations and more.

Chief commissioner Eric Liévin, one of the DSU's former commanders, states that "a criminal dealing with the DSU, has a better chance of surviving than another; they try to use a minimal level of violence/force, and yet try to attain a maximum level of efficiency."

History
The original DSU was created within the former Rijkswacht/Gendarmerie in 1972 in the aftermath of the Munich massacre and was called Group Diane.

In 1974 the name was changed from Diane to SIE (also outside Belgium) or ESI (also known as ).

In the 1980s, the unit operated against pro-leftist groups.

In 2001, all Belgian police forces (municipal, judicial and Rijkswacht/Gendarmerie) were reformed into the integrated police structured on two levels, the local police and the federal police. The SIE/ESI took the form of the Directorate of special units (DSU), which was part of the newly created federal police. In 2007 the DSU was integrated into the Office of the General Commissioner (CG) and its name was changed to CGSU. Due to an optimization reform within the federal police that started in 2014, the special units were moved from the Office of the General Commissioner to the General directorate of the judicial police (DGJ), one of the three general directorates resorting under the Office of the General Commissioner.  This was deemed more logical because of the operational and judicial nature of the assignments of the federal police's special units. Subsequently, the name and abbreviation was changed (back) to "Directorate of the special units (DSU)".

The DSU was deployed to hunt down suspects responsible for bombing the Brussels metro and airport with one suspect apprehended.

Its manpower in 2012, consist of 450 police officers and 62 civilians.

Organisation
The DSU is one of the four central directorates of the General directorate of the judicial police (DGJ), which is responsible for criminal investigations and anti-crime operations. The DSU consists of centralised units and decentralised units. The centralised units are called the "special units" and consist of:
 the Intervention unit
 the Observation unit
 the Undercover team (UCT)
 the National technical support unit (NTSU)

These are all stationed in a police caserne in Etterbeek.

There are four decentralised units, called "Protection, observation, support & arrest platoons" (POSA), spread over the country:
 POSA Gent
 POSA Antwerpen
 POSA Charleroi
 POSA Liège

Overall control of the DSU lies with the Ministry of Internal Affairs, but depending on circumstances the unit can be deployed under operational control of the Ministry of Justice. Prior to 1994 the unit was commanded by the Ministry of Defense.

Two more specialised units also exist, one team has six trained police dogs (They use Belgian Malinois) for detecting the presence of explosive materials or ammunition, the other one is the Disaster Victim Identification (DVI) team, which was created in 1978 after the Los Alfaques disaster. They've been involved in the Herald of Free Enterprise disaster, the Buizingen rail disaster in 2010 and a bus accident in 2012 in Switzerland.

Tasks
DSU provides ongoing support to the federal and local levels in the areas of:
 Intervention and arrest (hostage and barricaded suspect situations)
 Provision of expertise and advice
 Special investigative techniques
 Specialized technical support
 Support of specialised means (divers, climbers, snipers, maritime operation, etc.)
 Support of the European Anti-terrorism organisation 'Atlas' with the possibility of deployment abroad

Equipment

Weapons

 Accuracy International Arctic Warfare
 FN 303
 FN P90: Sometimes used with suppressors.
 FN SCAR: Sometimes used with suppressors.
 SIG MCX
 Glock 17
 Five-seven
 Heckler & Koch HK69
 Heckler & Koch MP5
 Heckler & Koch G3K, a smaller version of the Heckler & Koch G3
 Heckler & Koch HK417
 Heckler & Koch UMP
 Remington 870
 Sako TRG-21
 SIMON breach grenade

Gear
UF PRO clothing during training

References

Bibliography

External links
 

ATLAS Network
Police tactical units
Special forces of Belgium
Law enforcement in Belgium